Woodridge may refer to:

Australia
Woodridge, Queensland, a suburb of Brisbane
Woodridge railway station
Electoral district of Woodridge
Woodridge State High School 
Electoral district of Woodridge
Woodridge, Western Australia, a town near Perth

Canada
Woodridge, in the Rural Municipality of Piney, Manitoba
Woodridge Ecological Reserve
Woodridge Estates, Alberta (disambiguation)

New Zealand
Woodridge, New Zealand, a suburb of Wellington City

South Africa
Woodridge College

United Kingdom
Woodridge Nature Reserve, in Woodside Park, London

United States
Woodridge, Illinois
Woodridge School District 68 
Woodridge, Virginia
Wood-Ridge, New Jersey
Woodridge, New York
Woodridge, North Dakota
Woodridge, Washington, D.C., a neighborhood
Woodridge Neighborhood Library
Woodridge (Wheeling, West Virginia), a historic house
Woodridge Local School District, in Ohio
Woodridge High School

See also
Woodbridge (disambiguation)